Kuthannur or Kuthannoor may refer to

Kuthannur-I, a village in Palakkad district, Kerala, India
Kuthannur-II, a village in Palakkad district, Kerala, India
Kuthannoor (gram panchayat), a gram panchayat serving the above villages